Qiu Yong (born 28 July 1964) is a Chinese chemist. He is the current party secretary of Tsinghua University. Qiu is a member of the Chinese Academy of Sciences.

Early life and education
Qiu was born and raised in Rong County, Sichuan. 

Qiu received a bachelor of science and a doctor of science in chemistry from Tsinghua University in 1988 and 1994, respectively.

Career 
After the completion of his doctorate, Qiu joined Tsinghua University as a faculty member.

Qiu served as director of the Department of Chemistry and deputy dean of the School of Sciences, Tsinghua University. He served as vice president in December 2009, and in March 2015 he became president of Tsinghua University.

He was honored as a Distinguished Young Scholar by the National Science Fund for Distinguished Young Scholars in 2003. 

He was awarded as a Chang Jiang Scholar by the Chinese Ministry of Education in 2006. 

He was elected as a fellow of the Chinese Academy of Sciences in 2013.

In February 2022, he was appointed party secretary of Tsinghua University.

Award
 2011 First Award for National Technical Invention

Notes

References

1964 births
Living people
Chemists from Sichuan
Educators from Sichuan
Members of the Chinese Academy of Sciences
Members of the Standing Committee of the 13th National People's Congress
People from Zigong
Presidents of Tsinghua University
Tsinghua University alumni